Kasey Avalos (born March 19, 1992), known professionally as La Goony Chonga, is a Cuban-American rapper. While in college, she posted videos of her freestyling on YouTube and began recording music. She released her first two studio albums, Santeria Pussy (2013) and Santeria Pussy 2 (2015), after dropping out of school. After working as a stripper for three years in Miami, she moved to Los Angeles to record and release her first Spanish-language album, Dinero (2018), followed by her first full-length album, Dimen5ión (2019). Her EP Descontrol was released in 2021.

Life and career
Kasey Avalos was born on March 19, 1992 in Miami, Florida, and is Cuban-American. Her first language is Spanish. As a child, La Goony Chonga wrote poems and songs with her friends at school in a slam book. In 2012, while in college for advertising, La Goony Chonga began posting freestyles to YouTube under the name Twiggy Rasta Masta, her Tumblr username at the time. She also began recording songs in her home, and also released a video for her first song, "I Don't Play with Fuckboys", in 2012. Motivated by comments accusing her of lying about freestyling, she soon dropped out of college to pursue music full-time, and, in 2013, briefly moved from Miami to Los Angeles, where she performed live for the first time at the Ham on Everything party.

La Goony Chonga released her debut studio album, Santeria Pussy, in 2013, followed by her second studio album Santeria Pussy 2, in 2015. She worked as a stripper from 2014 until 2017, when she became pregnant. In 2016, she changed her stage name to La Goony Chonga, inspired by her own song "Goony Chonga Barbie", and started primarily making Latin trap music. She identifies as a chonga, a subculture of women that she has described as "a lifestyle and a reminder of who I am and where I come from" and as an aesthetic defined by hoop earrings, lip liner, nameplates, and Chinese slippers.

La Goony Chonga released her debut EP, Free Bankroll Chonga, in 2018. After moving to Los Angeles, La Goony Chonga got in contact with producers Freak City, with whom she made her third studio album and first Spanish-language album, Dinero, a trap and reggaeton record. The album's release was postponed for a year due to her pregnancy and it was released in September 2018. Her first full-length album, Dimen5ión, was released in 2019. In October 2019, she was featured on the song "Encore" from Brooke Candy's album Sexorcism. During the COVID-19 pandemic, she started a YouTube series, Chongafied, in which she turned friends into chongas. In December 2020, she made a cameo in Brooke Candy's music video for her song "Cum". On July 29, 2021, she released the experimental reggaeton EP, Descontrol, the title of which was inspired by two songs by Nicky Jam and Daddy Yankee both titled "Descontrol". NPR's Alt.Latino named the EP's title track one of the best songs of 2021.

La Goony Chonga performed as a supporting act on Pabllo Vittar's 2022 tour.

Musical style
La Goony Chonga raps in both English and in Spanish. Her music has been described as neoperreo, Latin trap, hip hop, and reggaeton. She is inspired by Madonna, citing her controversial attitude and freestyle music as influential for her. She is also heavily influenced by Ivy Queen, stating, "When you think of reggaeton artists–women–you think of her." Other influences for La Goony Chonga include Jennifer Lopez, Trina, Selena, Pitbull, and Celia Cruz. Mexican singer Sailorfag has called La Goony Chonga an inspiration.

Personal life
La Goony Chonga's son, Mazi, was born in 2018.

Discography

Studio albums

Extended plays

Singles

As lead artist

As featured artist

References

Living people
Rappers from Miami
Rappers from Los Angeles
Cuban women rappers
Cuban reggaeton musicians
Latin trap musicians
American female erotic dancers
American musicians of Cuban descent
21st-century women rappers
American women rappers
21st-century American rappers
Hispanic and Latino American rappers
Trap musicians
Southern hip hop musicians
1992 births
Neoperreo musicians